The Canton of Saint-François is a canton in the Arrondissement of Pointe-à-Pitre on the island of Guadeloupe.

Municipalities
Since the French canton reorganisation which came into effect in March 2015, the communes of the canton are:
La Désirade
Sainte-Anne (partly)
Saint-François

See also
Cantons of Guadeloupe
Communes of Guadeloupe
Arrondissements of Guadeloupe

References

Cantons of Guadeloupe